Steven S. Koblik (born August 10, 1941) is an American academic and executive. He is the former president of the Huntington Library and Reed College. Previously, he taught Swedish history and international politics at Pomona College for more than two decades. He is a member of the American Academy of Arts and Sciences.

References

Presidents of Reed College
Pomona College faculty
Fellows of the American Academy of Arts and Sciences
People associated with the Huntington Library

1941 births
Living people